Emily Clark may refer to:

 Emily Clark (ice hockey) (born 1995), Canadian ice hockey player
 Emily Clark (novelist) (1798–1833), English novelist and poet

See also
 Caroline Emily Clark (1825–1911), Australian social reformer